The 1963–64 National Football League was the 33rd staging of the National Football League (NFL), an annual Gaelic football tournament for the Gaelic Athletic Association county teams of Ireland.

New York again got a bye to the final. Dublin met them after a win over Down in the Home Final, and travelled to The Bronx for the final, also billed as the "World Championship". A Brendan O'Donnell goal after half-time allowed NY to build up a seven-point lead, which a Dublin rally reduced to one point. Late in the game, players brawled on the field and were joined by a spectator, who received a black eye. New York captain Tom Hennessy scored a late point to seal victory.

Format

Divisions
 Division I: 8 team. Split into two groups (one of five, one of four)
 Division II: 7 teams
 Division III: 7 teams. 
 Division III: 9 teams. Split into two groups (one of five, one of four)

Round-robin format
Each team played every other team in its division (or group where the division is split) once, either home or away.

Points awarded
2 points were awarded for a win and 1 for a draw.

Titles
Teams in all three divisions competed for the National Football League title.

Division I also doubled as the Dr Lagan Cup

Knockout stage qualifiers
 Division I: winners
 Division II: winners
 Division III: winners
 Division IV: winners

Knockout phase structure
4 Division winners play Semi-finals

Promotion and relegation

None

Separation of teams on equal points

In the event that teams finish on equal points, then a play-off will be used to determine group placings if necessary, i.e. where to decide semi-finalists.

Group stage

Division I (Dr Lagan Cup)

Inter-group play-offs

Group A

Group B

Division II

Division III

Division IV

Inter-group play-offs

Group A

Group B

Knockout stages

Semi-finals

Finals

References

National Football League
National Football League
National Football League (Ireland) seasons